Ahdım Olsun (It's My Vow) is the seventh studio album of Ebru Gündeş, the Turkish Turkish  pop-folk singer, actress, and television personality..

The album was published by Neşe Music and the Universal Music-Turkey label in 2001. The hit single of the album is Sensizim, with lyrics and music by the artist Altay, and was very popular in Turkey. The second single was Telafi, which was also highly successful. The third single of the album was named Seni Seviyorum (I Love You). Other songs on the album include Akıllı Ol, Senin Olmaya Geldim, and a song written by Yıldız Tilbe, called Vazgeçmem. Vazgeçmem won high critical acclaim in Turkey, after which a new remix version was released. On this new album there is also a change: a song which a Sezen Aksu cover. In the album there is also an instrumental version of the song Ahdım Olsun.

Track listing
 Ahdum Olsun – (It is My Vow)
 Sensizim – (I Am Without You)
 Akıllı Ol – (Be Smart)
 Seni Seviyorum – (I Love You)
 Telafi – (Compensation)
 Senin Olmaya Geldim – (I Came To Be Yours)
 Sevdim İnkâr Etmedim – (I Loved, I Did Not Deny)
 Sabahlar Uzak – (Mornings Are Far)
 Kaybedenler – (Losers)
 Allah Seninle Olsun / Sonun Olurum – (Let Allah Be With You / I'll Be Your End)
 Vazgeçmem – (I Do Not Give Up)
 Benim Dünyam – (My World)
 Bir İnat Uğruna / Muallaktayım – (In the Cause of a Dermination / I'm in Suspended)

References

2001 albums
Ebru Gündeş albums